"Danger" is a song by American hip hop group Migos and American EDM producer and DJ Marshmello, taken from the soundtrack of the 2017 American urban fantasy action crime film, Bright (2017). It was written by the artists alongside Paul Judge, who produced it with Marshmello, with production handled by the latter two. The song was released on December 7, 2017. "Danger" debuted at 82 on the Billboard Hot 100. It was certified Gold by the Recording Industry Association of America on April 30, 2019.

Background
"Danger" is taken from the soundtrack of Will Smith movie, Bright, which debuted on Netflix Dec. 22. The track was teased in the trailer for "Bright" and on Marshmello's Twitter

Music video
The official music video was released on December 7, 2017 on Atlantic Records' channel.

In the video, Migos and Marshmello can be seen standing in the middle of a nightclub, surrounded by neon lights and women. It provides footage from an excerpt of the movie where a cop duo of Will Smith's character, Daryl Ward, who is a human, and Joel Edgerton's Nick Jakoby, who plays an Orc creature, lurk in a crowd in search of a powerful weapon. A pack of men begin opening fire on Ward and Jakoby, causing the pair to escape with the help of an elf, played by Lucy Fry. Migos continues to rap, while champagne glasses and mirrors shatter into pieces around them.

Charts

Certifications

References

2017 songs
2017 singles
Bright (franchise)
Migos songs
Marshmello songs
Songs written by Quavo
Songs written by Offset (rapper)
Songs written by Takeoff (rapper)
Songs written for films
Songs written by Marshmello